Chun Jae-ho (born August 8, 1979) is a South Korean football manager and former professional player who played as a midfielder. He is the interim manager of Hanoi FC of V.League 1 as of 2022.

Club career statistics

Honours

Manager
 Hanoi FC
V.League 1: 2022
Vietnamese Cup: 2022

External links
 

1979 births
Living people
Association football midfielders
South Korean footballers
Seongnam FC players
Incheon United FC players
Busan IPark players
Gangwon FC players
K League 1 players